Charles Melburn "Mel" Wilcox is a Professor of Medicine and director of the Division of Gastroenterology and Hepatology at the University of Alabama, Birmingham. Wilcox has authored over 200 peer-reviewed publications, book chapters, and miscellaneous articles such as Atlas of Clinical Gastrointestinal Endoscopy.

Sources 
 http://www.dom.uab.edu/gastro/
 Help Heartburn Faculty : C. Mel Wilcox, MD
 http://www.bukabuku.com/browse/bookdetail/50129/atlas-of-clinical-gastrointestinal-endoscopy.html

References 

Living people
University of Alabama at Birmingham faculty
Year of birth missing (living people)
American gastroenterologists